The Go-Giver: A Little Story About a Powerful Business Idea is a business book written by Bob Burg and John D. Mann. It is a story about the power of giving. The first edition was published on December 27, 2007 by Portfolio Hardcover.

Summary 
The Go-Giver revolves around the story of a young professional (Joe) who is striving for success. Joe is ambitious, however lately it seems like his hard work and efforts are not paying off in terms of results. Following a disappointing quarter for sales results, he inadvertently seeks the mentorship of The Chairman.

Joe then embarks on a learning journey by meeting Go-Givers—friends of The Chairman. Through these interactions he learns of the "Five Laws of Stratospheric Success":

Value: Your true worth is determined by how much more you give in value than you take in payment.
Compensation: Your income is determined by how many people you serve and how well you serve them.
Influence: Your influence is determined by how abundantly you place other people's interests first.
Authenticity: The most valuable gift you have to offer is yourself.
Receptivity: The key to effective giving is to stay open to receiving.

Reception 
The book was ranked ninth on the 2008 Businessweek Best Seller list.

See also
 Lifestyle guru
 Motivation

References

External links
The Go-Giver Official Website
Interview with Bob about "The Go-Giver"

2008 novels
Business books
Business fables
Self-help books